Kyburg may refer to:
Henry E. Kyburg, Jr. (1928–2007), philosopher/logician
Kyburg, Zurich, a town in the Canton of Zurich, Switzerland
Kyburg (castle), a castle in the municipality Kyburg, Switzerland
House of Kyburg that took their name from the castle
 County of Kyburg, a former administrative unit in the Canton of Zurich, Switzerland
Kyburg-Buchegg, a municipality in the Canton of Solothurn, Switzerland